The Billboard Music Award for Top Streaming Song (Audio) winners and nominees.

Winners and nominees

Multiple wins and nominations

Wins
2 wins
 Drake

Nominations
5 nominations

 Drake

4 nominations

 Justin Bieber
 Post Malone
 The Weeknd

2 nominations

 Cardi B
 DaBaby
 Fun.
 Lil Wayne
 Pharrell Williams
 Swae Lee

References

Billboard awards